Walski is a surname. Notable people with the surname include:

 Brian Walski (born 1958), American photographer
 Michał Walski (born 1997), Polish footballer

See also
 Kowalski (surname)
Walske
Wilensky (surname)
Wolodarsky (surname)